Urticina is a genus of relatively large and often colorful sea anemones in the family Actiniidae from the North Pacific, North Atlantic and Arctic Oceans.

Species
The following species are listed in the World Register of Marine Species (WoRMS):

Urticina asiatica  (Averincev, 1967)
Urticina clandestina Sanamyan N., Sanamyan K. & McDaniel, 2013
Urticina coccinea  (Verrill, 1866)
Urticina columbiana  Verrill, 1922 – crusty red anemone, columbia sand anemone, sand anemone, and sand-rose anemone
Urticina coriacea  (Cuvier, 1798) – red beaded anemone
Urticina crassicornis (Müller, 1776) – Christmas anemone
Urticina eques (Gosse, 1858) – white-spotted rose anemone or strawberry anemone
Urticina felina  (Linnaeus, 1761) – northern red anemone 
Urticina grebelnyi  Sanamyan, N.P. & Sanamyan, K.E., 2006
Urticina macloviana (Lesson, 1830)
Urticina mcpeaki  Hauswaldt & Pearson, 1999
Urticina piscivora  (Sebens & Laakso, 1978) – fish-eating anemone and fish-eating urticina
Urticina tuberculata  Cocks, 1850

References

External links

Actiniidae
Hexacorallia genera
Taxa named by Christian Gottfried Ehrenberg